The cuisine of Nauru is the traditional cuisine of the island state on the Pacific Ocean. 

Nauru has the world's highest rate of obesity.

Basic foods

Like its other island neighbors, Nauruans consume a large amount of seafood, as well as foods made from coconuts and pandanus fruits. Coconut milk is also used extensively in Nauru. Coconut fish (raw fish, often tuna, served in coconut milk with seasonings) is a traditional dish. 

The native Nauruan names of traditional crops are:

epo/épo: Pandanus tectorius
ini: Cocos nucifera

Influences
Nauruan cuisine is greatly influenced by Chinese cuisine. The Chinese are the major foreign community of the country, and there are a number of Chinese restaurants on the island, most notably in Yaren.

Nauruan cuisine also shows strong Western influence.

Traditions
The majority of Nauruans are Christians, and members of the Nauru Congregational Church. They often celebrate Christmas with cakes made from banana and coconut.

Some desserts, such as coconut mousse, are consumed on special occasions.

References

Further reading
 "NAURU: Elmina Quadina’s even better Nauruan coconut fish", Locally Foreign

Nauruan cuisine